Oborishte is a Bulgarian association football club based in the town of Panagyurishte, Pazardzhik Province, currently playing in the Third League, the third level of Bulgarian football.

History 
Oborishte was founded in 1925 as Aprilski yunak. In 2015, the club secured promotion to the B Group for the first time in the club's history.

League positions

Honours
 Second League:
 10th: 2015–16 
 South-Western Third League:
  Champions (1): 2014–15
  Runners up (1): 2018–19

Current squad

References

External links
 Official website
 Club profile at bgclubs.eu

Oborishte
Panagyurishte